Sharon Xiangwen Xie is a Chinese biostatistician and epidemiologist who studies neurodegenerative diseases. She is a professor of biostatistics in the Department of Biostatistics, Epidemiology, and Informatics at the University of Pennsylvania.

Education
Xie earned a bachelor's degree in applied mathematics at Beijing University of Technology in 1991. She came to the University of Texas for a master's degree in statistics, completed in 1993, and then moved to the University of Washington where she earned a second master's degree in biostatistics in 1995 and a Ph.D. in 1997. Her dissertation, Covariate Measurement Error Methods In Failure Time Regression, was supervised by Ross L. Prentice.

Career
Xie was elected as a Fellow of the American Statistical Association in 2018. She is program chair for the Biometrics Section of the American Statistical Association at the 2019 Joint Statistical Meetings. She was elected secretary of the ASA Lifetime Data Science Section in 2021.

References

Year of birth missing (living people)
Living people
American statisticians
Chinese statisticians
Women statisticians
Biostatisticians
University of Texas at Austin alumni
University of Washington alumni
University of Pennsylvania faculty
Fellows of the American Statistical Association